Ivan Khristov (born 3 March 1982) is a Bulgarian sprint canoer who competed in the early to mid-2000s. He won a bronze medal in the K-4 1000 m event at the 2002 ICF Canoe Sprint World Championships in Seville.

Khristov also competed in two events at the 2004 Summer Olympics in Athens, finishing fourth in the K-4 1000 m while being eliminated in the semifinals of the K-2 500 m event.

References

Sports-reference.com profile
Yahoo! Sports profile

1982 births
Bulgarian male canoeists
Canoeists at the 2004 Summer Olympics
Living people
Olympic canoeists of Bulgaria
ICF Canoe Sprint World Championships medalists in kayak